Peter Bryan Wells (born May 12, 1963) is an American prelate of the Catholic Church who has spent most of his career in the diplomatic service of the Holy See. He has worked in Rome in the administration of the Secretariat of State and in foreign postings. He has been an archbishop and a nuncio since 2016.

Biography

Early years 
Wells was born the first of five children in Tulsa, Oklahoma. He completed his studies in philosophy at St. Meinrad Seminary College in Saint Meinrad, Indiana. He completed his studies in theology at the Pontifical North American College in Rome.  In 1990, he obtained a Bachelor of Theology degree from the Pontifical Gregorian University

Priesthood 
Wells was ordained a priest on July 12, 1991 for the Diocese of Tulsa. After his ordination, Wells worked as a curate at Holy Family Cathedral Parish in Tulsa, special secretary to the bishop of Tulsa, and vicar for religious education in the diocese.  He soon returned to Rome, receiving a Licentiate of Theology at the John Paul II Pontifical Theological Institute for Studies on Marriage and Family in 1992.   In 1998 and 1999, Wells received a Licentiate of Canon Law and a Doctor of Canon Law degree from the Gregorian University. At the same time, he was a student at the Pontifical Ecclesiastical Academy in Rome.

Diplomatic service

Wells entered the diplomatic service of the Holy See on July 1, 1999, working in the apostolic nunciature in Nigeria and, beginning in 2002, in the Section for General Affairs of the Secretariat of State. He was appointed to head the English-language desk in 2006. Besides his native English, Wells speaks Italian, French, German and Spanish.

He was named assessor on July 16, 2009. Speaking about his work as assessor of general affairs, Wells said that the role of papal diplomacy was to allow Pope Francis and his representatives to "have the ability to act freely in the world" and not be "impeded in their ministry," especially in reaching out to the most marginalized.

Pope Francis named Wells secretary of the five-member Pontifical Commission, responsible for investigating the Institute for the Works of Religion in 2013. Wells also served as president of the Holy See's Financial Security Committee.

On February 9, 2016 Wells was appointed apostolic nuncio to South Africa and Botswana and titular archbishop of Marcianopolis. On February 13, he was also named apostolic nuncio to Lesotho and Namibia. He was consecrated a archbishop on March 19, 2016 by Pope Francis. On June 13, 2016, Wells was also appointed apostolic nuncio to Eswatini.

On 8 February 2023, Pope Francis appointed him as nuncio to Thailand and Cambodia and Apostolic Delegate to Laos.

See also
 List of heads of the diplomatic missions of the Holy See

Notes

References

External links 
 

 

 

 

 

 

 

 

 

Pontifical Gregorian University alumni
1963 births
Living people
People from Tulsa, Oklahoma
Pontifical Ecclesiastical Academy alumni
Pontifical North American College alumni
Apostolic Nuncios to South Africa
21st-century American Roman Catholic titular archbishops
Apostolic Nuncios to Botswana
Apostolic Nuncios to Eswatini
Apostolic Nuncios to Namibia
Apostolic Nuncios to Lesotho
Apostolic Nuncios to Thailand
Apostolic Nuncios to Cambodia
Apostolic Nuncios to Laos
John Paul II Institute alumni
Roman Catholic Diocese of Tulsa
Catholics from Oklahoma